Phostria melanophthalma is a moth in the family Crambidae. It was described by Edward Meyrick in 1933. It is found in the Democratic Republic of the Congo (Orientale, Equateur, East Kasai).

References

Phostria
Moths described in 1933
Moths of Africa